Portridge is a historic plantation house located near Louisburg, Franklin County, North Carolina.  It was built about 1780, and is a -story, three bay, single pile Georgian style frame dwelling.  It has a gable roof, three brick chimneys, and a one-room rear ell.  It was moved to its present location in 1984, and subsequently restored.

It was listed on the National Register of Historic Places in 1990.

References

Plantation houses in North Carolina
Houses on the National Register of Historic Places in North Carolina
Georgian architecture in North Carolina
Houses completed in 1780
Houses in Franklin County, North Carolina
National Register of Historic Places in Franklin County, North Carolina